Hasan Khani (also Romanized as Ḩasan Khānī) is a village in Jolgah Rural District, in the Central District of Jahrom County, Fars Province, Iran. At the 2006 census, its population was 92, in 22 families.

References 

Populated places in Jahrom County